Abdullah Mohamed H. Al-Buloushi (born 5 September 1960) is a Kuwaiti former footballer. He played for Al Arabi and Kuwait.

References

1960 births
Living people
1980 AFC Asian Cup players
1982 FIFA World Cup players
1984 AFC Asian Cup players
Al-Arabi SC (Kuwait) players
Kuwaiti footballers
Kuwait international footballers
Kuwaiti people of Iranian descent
Kuwaiti people of Baloch descent
Olympic footballers of Kuwait
Footballers at the 1980 Summer Olympics
AFC Asian Cup-winning players
Asian Games medalists in football
Footballers at the 1982 Asian Games
Sportspeople from Kuwait City
Asian Games silver medalists for Kuwait
Association football forwards
Medalists at the 1982 Asian Games
Kuwait Premier League players